The Yanliao Biota is the name given to an assembly of fossils preserved in northeastern China from the Middle to Late Jurassic. It includes fossils from the Tiaojishan Formation, Lanqi Formation, Jiulongshan Formation and Haifanggou Formation. This spans approximately 199 to 146 million years ago.

Like the Jehol Biota, these deposits are composed of alternating layers of volcanic tuff and sediment, and are considered Lagerstätte. These are some of the best preserved Jurassic fossils in the world, and include many important dinosaur, mammal, salamander, insect and lizard specimens, as well as plants.

History 

The first fossils of the Yanliao Biota were found around 1998 near the village of Daohugou in Inner Mongolia. The following year, the first two important specimens were discovered, and published in 2000. Since that time many more have been found from the same area, and in neighbouring provinces.

The Yanliao Biota is made up of fossils from more than one locality, and the geology has been difficult to interpret (see below). It includes what was previously referred to as the Daohugou Biota, and some of it was thought to belong to the Jehol Biota.

Location
The Yanliao Biota comes from outcrops north of the Han Mountains, in the northeast of the People's Republic of China. The most important site is near Daohugou Village in Inner Mongolia, but fossils and outcrops are also found in neighbouring Liaoning Province and Heibei Province.

Geology

The Dauhugou locality lies in the Ningchen Basin in the SE corner of Inner Mongolia. Dauhugou village has fossil-bearing lacustrine (laid down in lakes) strata overlying precambrian basement.

Fossil preservation
The formations that yield the fossils of the Yanliao Biota are known as Lagerstätte, meaning that they have exceptionally good conditions for fossil preservation. The fossils are not only numerous, but also very well preserved. For vertebrates, there are often whole skeletons with soft tissues like skin and fur, colour patterns, and stomach contents. Insects are intact with wings and patterns preserved, and plants have their leaves and flowers still attached.  The volcanic ash layers quickly buried the organisms, and created an anoxic environment around them, preventing scavenging and helping preserve them.

Fossils

Dinosaurs
Anchiornis huxleyi 
Epidendrosaurus ningchengensis
Epidexipteryx hui
Pedopenna daohouensis
Xiaotingia shengi
Aurornis xui
Eosinopteryx brevipenna
Tianyulong confuciusi

Pterosaurs
Jeholopterus ningchengensis
Archaeoistiodactylus linglongtaensis (possibly Darwinopterus; Martill and Etches, 2012)
Changchengopterus
Darwinopterus modularis
Darwinopterus linglongtaensis
Darwinopterus robustodens
Jianchangnathus robustus
Jianchangopterus zhaoianus
Fenghuangopterus lii
Kunpengopterus sinensis
Wukongopterus lii
Changchengopterus pani
Dendrorhynchoides mutoudengensis
Qinglongopterus guoi
Pterorhynchus wellnhoferi

Mammaliaforms
Castorocauda lutrasimilis 
Agilodocodon gracilis 
Docofossor brachydactylus 
Microdocodon gracilis

Caudates
Beiyanerpeton jianpingensis
Chunerpetron tianyensis
Jeholotriton paradoxus
Liaoxitriton daohugouensis
Pangerpeton sinensis

See also 

Daohugou Biota

References

Geology of China
Natural history of China
Geography of Liaoning
Geography of Hebei
Geography of Inner Mongolia
Geography of Northeast Asia
Geologic formations of China
Paleontology in Liaoning
Paleontology in Hebei
Prehistoric biotas